Erbim Fagu (born 15 April 1987) is a retired Albanian professional footballer who played as a defender. He retired from football at the early age of 27 due to numerous injuries. After retiring from playing football Erbim Fagu started his career as a coach. His beginnings as a coach were in the Akademia Futbollit created by two former national team players Alban Bushi and Redi Jupi. During this journey to this academy, he grew professionally and won his first trophies as a coach. After two years in this academy, Erbim Fagu was transferred to one of the best private academies in Albania, Football Republic, which was created in 2018 by Redi Jupi, with whom they had worked together before in the Akademia Futbollit. In three years Erbim Fagu won many trophies making this academy one of the most famous in Albania. In June 2021 Erbim Fagu signed a three-year contract with the team of KF.Tirana. He was appointed as an assistant coach in the first team and Head Coach KF.Tirana u-21. http://www.mcntv.al/2021/06/28/trajneri-34-vje-ar-rikthehet-te-tirana-em-rohet-n-stolin-e-bardhebluve This year he won the title of 26th champion with the first team.  https://euronews.al/kryesore/2022/05/07/tirana-shpallet-kampione-pas-fitores-ne-derbi-me-partizanin/. After winning Albania Superliga with KF.Tirana travels abroad to the Netherlands to continue his career there. After some experience in amateur clubs, he is now hired as a coach in Coerver Netherlands.

Club career
Fagu was signed by KF Elbasani in the summer of 2008 after agreeing on a fee believed to be around $120,000 with their fierce rivals KF Tirana. He signed for Dinamo Tirana after KF Elbasani were relegated after the 2008–09 season. Following the club's defeat and elimination from the Europa League, Fagu signed for Besa Kavajë and this year won the Albania Cup and runner-up in Albania Superliga. One year later, Fagu signed for Skenderbeu Korce and won the Albania Superliga four times in a row.

Skënderbeu Korçë
On 16 May 2011, the final day of the 2010–11 season, he suffered an injury causing distortive trauma in his left knee. He quickly traveled to Rome, Italy to see a specialist about the extent of the damage and then have his knee operated on on on 28 May. Following the operation he continued regular physiotherapy which would enable him to begin training again in three months, but he was expected to not be able to play for at least another five months. Fagu made his long-awaited return on 12 November 2011 during the international break in a friendly against FK Renova.

International career

In May 2012, Fagu was called up for the first time in senior team by the coach Gianni De Biasi for the friendly matches against Qatar and Iran.

Style of play
He was a very versatile player. He was skillful from a technical standpoint, Fagu was a physically strong, consistent, aggressive, and hard-tackling defender, with an extremely high work rate; he also possessed a powerful shot, and quick reactions, as well as an excellent positional sense and good anticipation, which enabled him to excel in this position; in his prime, he was widely regarded as one of the best right back in Albania. He has played in defense, midfield, and as a forward, mainly on the right-hand side. During his time at Besa Kavajë, he mainly played as a right full-back but also in midfield. In Skënderbeu Korçë he plays right full-back.

Honours

Club
KF Tirana
 Albanian Superliga (1): 2004–05
 Albanian Supercup (1): 2007

 Besa Kavajë
 Albanian Cup (1): 2009–10

Skënderbeu Korçë
 Albanian Superliga (4): 2010–11, 2011–12, 2012–13, 2013–14
 Albanian Cup Runner–up (1): 2011–12
 Albanian Supercup (1): 2013

Training career
From 2015 to 2018 have trained at Akademia Futbollit Academy. From 2018 to 2021 have trained at Football Republic Redi Jupi academy. He trains age levels from 7 years old to 19 years old. In 2021 Fagu have signed with KF.Tirana as Head Coach u-21 and assistant coach in the first team http://www.mcntv.al/2021/06/28/trajneri-34-vje-ar-rikthehet-te-tirana-em-rohet-n-stolin-e-bardhebluve .After some experiences in amateur football clubs in Amsterdam at the youth level AFC DWS and Ziudoost United, he now works at Coerver Netherlands.

Honours

•AKADEMIA FUTBOLLIT

 Tirana Regional Champions U-15  (2016-2017)
 Albania Champions U-15  (2016-2017)
 Tirana Regional Champions U-13 (2015-2016)

•FOOTBALL REPUBLIC

 South Albanian Champions First Category U-17  (2018-2019)
 Albania Champions First Category U-17         (2018-2019)
 South Albanian Champions First Category U-19  (2019-2020)
 Albania Champions First Category U-19         (2019-2020)

•KF.TIRANA

Albania Superliga  (2021-2022)

References

External links
 

1987 births
Living people
Footballers from Tirana
Albanian footballers
Albania under-21 international footballers
Albania youth international footballers
Association football defenders
KF Tirana players
KF Teuta Durrës players
KF Elbasani players
FK Dinamo Tirana players
Besa Kavajë players
KF Skënderbeu Korçë players
Kategoria Superiore players